Kamanjab (place of big stones) is a village of 6,012 people in the Kunene region of Namibia. It is the administrative centre of the Kamanjab Constituency.

Economy and infrastructure
As with most Namibian self-governed settlements, Kamanjab is affected by urbanisation. The village has an area where new low-income inhabitants may temporarily settle for a small fee. Once they have stayed for 5 years and paid every month, the plot where they stay is allocated to them.

Politics

Kamanjab is governed by a village council that has five seats.

The 2015 local authority election was won by the SWAPO party which gained three seats (689 votes). The remaining two seats went to the United Democratic Front (UDF) with 375 votes. The 2020 local authority election was won by the UDF which gained 606 votes and two seats. SWAPO was runner up with 541 votes and two seats. The remaining seat went to the Popular Democratic Movement (PDM, 82 votes).

References

Villages in Namibia
Populated places in the Kunene Region